This is an incomplete list of Statutory Rules of Northern Ireland in 2006.

1-100

 Control of Noise at Work Regulations (Northern Ireland) 2006 (S.R. 2006 No. 1)
 Official Feed and Food Controls Regulations (Northern Ireland) 2006 (S.R. 2006 No. 2)
 Food Hygiene Regulations (Northern Ireland) 2006 (S.R. 2006 No. 3)
 Occupational Pension Schemes (Consultation by Employers) (Modification for Multi-employer Schemes) Regulations (Northern Ireland) 2006 (S.R. 2006 No. 4)
 Weighing Equipment (Non-automatic Weighing Machines) Regulations (Northern Ireland) 2006 (S.R. 2006 No. 5)
 Local Government Pension Scheme (Civil Partnership) (Amendment) Regulations (Northern Ireland) 2006 (S.R. 2006 No. 6)
 Rates (Regional Rates) Order (Northern Ireland) 2006 	S.R. 2006 No. 7)
 Rules of the Supreme Court (Northern Ireland) (Amendment) 2006 (S.R. 2006 No. 10)
 Criminal Appeal (Retrial for Serious Offences) (Amendment) Rules (Northern Ireland) 2006 (S.R. 2006 No. 11)
 Criminal Appeal (Prosecution Appeals) (Amendment) Rules (Northern Ireland) 2006 (S.R. 2006 No. 12)
 Disability Discrimination (Code of Practice) (Schools) (Appointed Day) Order (Northern Ireland) 2006 (S.R. 2006 No. 16)
 Disability Discrimination (Code of Practice) (Further and Higher Education) (Appointed Day) Order (Northern Ireland) 2006 (S.R. 2006 No. 17)
 Feeding Stuffs and the Feeding Stuffs (Sampling and Analysis) (Amendment) Regulations (Northern Ireland) 2006 (S.R. 2006 No. 18)
 Police Service of Northern Ireland and Police Service of Northern Ireland Reserve (Full-Time) (Severance) Amendment Regulations 2006 (S.R. 2006 No. 19)
 Personal Pension Schemes (Appropriate Schemes) (Amendment) Regulations (Northern Ireland) 2006 (S.R. 2006 No. 20)
 Insolvency (2005 Order) (Commencement No. 1) Order (Northern Ireland) 2006 (S.R. 2006 No. 21)
 Insolvency (2005 Order) (Transitional Provisions and Savings) Order (Northern Ireland) 2006 (S.R. 2006 No. 22)
 Insolvency (Amendment) Regulations (Northern Ireland) 2006 (S.R. 2006 No. 23)
 Insolvency (Northern Ireland) Order 1989, Article 59A (Appointed Date) Order (Northern Ireland) 2006 (S.R. 2006 No. 24)
 Insolvency (Northern Ireland) Order 1989 (Prescribed Part) Order (Northern Ireland) 2006 (S.R. 2006 No. 25)
 Insolvency (Monetary Limits) (Amendment) Order (Northern Ireland) 2006 (S.R. 2006 No. 26)
 Access to Justice (Northern Ireland) Order 2003 (Commencement No. 5) Order (Northern Ireland) 2006 (S.R. 2006 No. 27)
 Education (Student Loans) (Repayment) (Amendment) Regulations (Northern Ireland) 2006 (S.R. 2006 No. 28)
 Higher Education (2005 Order) (Commencement) Order (Northern Ireland) 2006 (S.R. 2006 No. 30)
 Motor Vehicles (Construction and Use) (Amendment) Regulations (Northern Ireland) 2006 (S.R. 2006 No. 32)
 Insolvency Practitioners Regulations (Northern Ireland) 2006 (S.R. 2006 No. 33)
 Drainage (Environmental Impact Assessment) Regulations (Northern Ireland) 2006 (S.R. 2006 No. 34)
 Measuring Instruments (EEC Requirements) (Verification Fees) Regulations (Northern Ireland) 2006 (S.R. 2006 No. 35)
 Weights and Measures (Passing as Fit for Use for Trade and Adjustment Fees) Regulations (Northern Ireland) 2006 (S.R. 2006 No. 36)
 Pensions (2004 Act and 2005 Order) (PPF Payments and FAS Payments) (Consequential Provisions) Order (Northern Ireland) 2006 (S.R. 2006 No. 37)
 Local Government (General Grant) (Amendment) Regulations (Northern Ireland) 2006 S.R. No. 39)
 Diseases of Animals (Amendment) Regulations (Northern Ireland) 2006 (S.R. 2006 No. 41)
 Foot-and-Mouth Disease Regulations (Northern Ireland) 2006 (S.R. 2006 No. 42)
 Foot-and-Mouth Disease (Control of Vaccination) Regulations (Northern Ireland) 2006 (S.R. 2006 No 43)
 Misuse of Drugs (Amendment) Regulations (Northern Ireland) 2006 (S.R. 2006 No. 44)
 Pensions (2005 Order) (Commencement No. 8 and Appointed Day) Order (Northern Ireland) 2006 (S.R. 2006 No. 45)
 Disability Discrimination (Services and Premises) (Amendment) Regulations (Northern Ireland) 2006 (S.R. 2006 No. 46)
 Insolvency (Amendment) Rules (Northern Ireland) 2006 (S.R. 2006 No. 47)
 Occupational and Personal Pension Schemes (Consultation by Employers) Regulations (Northern Ireland) 2006 (S.R. 2006 No. 48)
 Occupational Pension Schemes (Early Leavers: Cash Transfer Sums and Contribution Refunds) Regulations (Northern Ireland) 2006 (S.R. 2006 No. 49)
 Pension Protection Fund (Pension Compensation Cap) Order (Northern Ireland) 2006 (S.R. 2006 No. 50)
 Education (Prohibition from Teaching or Working with Children) Regulations (Northern Ireland) 2006 (S.R. 2006 No. 51)
 Less Favoured Area Compensatory Allowances Regulations (Northern Ireland) 2006 (S.R. 2006 No. 52)
 Insolvency Practitioners and Insolvency Account (Fees) Order (Northern Ireland) 2006 (S.R. 2006 No. 53)
 Insolvency (Fees) Order (Northern Ireland) 2006 (S.R. 2006 No. 54)
 Insolvency (Deposits) Order (Northern Ireland) 2006 (S.R. 2006 No. 55)
 Renewables Obligation Order (Northern Ireland) 2006 (S.R. 2006 No. 57)
 Infected Waters (Infectious Pancreatic Necrosis) (Revocation) Order (Northern Ireland) 2006 (S.R. 2006 No. 57)
 Registered Rents (Increase) Order (Northern Ireland) 2006 (S.R. 2006 No. 58)
 Dairy Produce Quotas (Amendment) Regulations (Northern Ireland) 2006 (S.R. 2006 No. 60)
 Insolvency (Northern Ireland) Order 2005 (Minor and Consequential Amendments) Order (Northern Ireland) 2006 (S.R. 2006 No. 61)
 Criminal Justice (Evidence) (Northern Ireland) Order 2004 (Categories of Offences) Order 2006 (S.R. 2006 No. 62)
 Criminal Justice (Evidence) (Northern Ireland) Order 2004 (Commencement No. 3) Order 2006 (S.R. 2006 No. 63)
 Tax Credits (Approval of Home Child Care Providers) Scheme (Northern Ireland) 2006 (S.R. 2006 No. 64)
 Occupational Pension Schemes (Republic of Ireland Schemes Exemption (Revocation) and Tax Exempt Schemes (Miscellaneous Amendments)) Regulations (Northern Ireland) 2006 (S.R. 2006 No. 65)
 Plant Health (Wood and Bark) Order (Northern Ireland) 2006 (S.R. 2006 No. 66)
 Road Traffic (Health Services Charges) (Amendment) Regulations (Northern Ireland) 2006 (S.R. 2006 No. 67)
 Police (Recruitment) (Amendment) Regulations (Northern Ireland) 2006 (S.R. 2006 No. 69)
 Social Security (Preparation for Employment Programme 50 to 59 Pilot) Regulations (Northern Ireland) 2006 (S.R. 2006 No. 70)
 Social Security Pensions (Low Earnings Threshold) Order (Northern Ireland) 2006 (S.R. 2006 No. 71)
 Social Security Revaluation of Earnings Factors Order (Northern Ireland) 2006 (S.R. 2006 No. 72)
 Taxis (Enniskillen) Bye-Laws (Northern Ireland) 2006 (S.R. 2006 No. 73)
 Public Service Vehicles (Conditions of Fitness, Equipment and Use) (Amendment) Regulations (Northern Ireland) 2006 (S.R. 2006 No. 74)
 Employment Rights (Increase of Limits) Order (Northern Ireland) 2006 (S.R. 2006 No. 75)
 Credit Unions (Limit on Membership) Order (Northern Ireland) 2006 (S.R. 2006 No. 76)
 Credit Unions (Limit on Shares) Order (Northern Ireland) 2006 (S.R. 2006 No. 77)
 Credit Unions (Deposits and Loans) Order (Northern Ireland) 2006 (S.R. 2006 No. 78)
 Legal Aid (General) (Amendment) Regulations (Northern Ireland) 2006 (S.R. 2006 No. 79)
 Legal Aid (Assessment of Resources) (Amendment) Regulations (Northern Ireland) 2006 (S.R. 2006 No. 80)
 Organic Farming (Conversion of Animal Housing) (Amendment) Scheme (Northern Ireland) 2006 (S.R. 2006 No. 81)
 Plant Health Order (Northern Ireland) 2006 (S.R. 2006 No. 82)
 Motorways Traffic (Amendment) Regulations (Northern Ireland) 2006 (S.R. 2006 No. 83)
 Occupational Pension Schemes (Pension Protection Levies) (Transitional Period and Modification for Multi-employer Schemes) Regulations (Northern Ireland) 2006 (S.R. 2006 No. 84)
 Occupational Pension Schemes (Fraud Compensation Levy) Regulations (Northern Ireland) 2006 (S.R. 2006 No. 85)
 Information and Consultation of Employees (Amendment) Regulations (Northern Ireland) 2006 (S.R. 2006 No. 86)
 Pneumoconiosis, etc., (Workers' Compensation) (Payment of Claims) (Amendment) Regulations (Northern Ireland) 2006 87)
 Local Government (Accounts and Audit) Regulations (Northern Ireland) 2006 (S.R. 2006 No. 89)
 Environmental Impact Assessment (Uncultivated Land and Semi-Natural Areas) Regulations (Northern Ireland) 2006 (S.R. 2006 No. 90)
 Social Security (Claims and Payments) (Amendment) Regulations (Northern Ireland) 2006 (S.R. 2006 No. 91)
 Pension Protection Fund (Risk-based Pension Protection Levy) Regulations (Northern Ireland) 2006 (S.R. 2006 No. 92)
 Companies (Audit, Investigations and Community Enterprise) (2005 Order) (Commencement No. 1 and Transitional Provision) Order (Northern Ireland) 2006 (S.R. 2006 No. 93)
 Companies (1986 Order) (Operating and Financial Review) (Repeal) Regulations (Northern Ireland) 2006 (S.R. 2006 No. 94)
 Pensions (2005 Order) (Commencement No. 9) Order (Northern Ireland) 2006 (S.R. 2006 No. S.R. 2006 No. 95)
 Social Security (Industrial Injuries) (Prescribed Diseases) (Amendment) Regulations (Northern Ireland) 2006 (S.R. 2006 No. 96)
 Social Security (Miscellaneous Amendments) Regulations (Northern Ireland) 2006 (S.R. 2006 No. 97)
 Pollution Prevention and Control (Miscellaneous Amendments) Regulations (Northern Ireland) 2006 (S.R. 2006 No. 98)
 Employment Code of Practice (Access and Unfair Practices during Recognition and Derecognition Ballots) (Appointed Day) Order (Northern Ireland) 2006 (S.R. 2006 No. 100)

101-200

 Employment Code of Practice (Industrial Action Ballots and Notice to Employers) (Appointed Day) Order (Northern Ireland) 2006 (S.R. 2006 No. 101)
 Health and Personal Social Services (Assessment of Resources) (Amendment) Regulations (Northern Ireland) 2006 (S.R. 2006 No. 103)
 Social Security (Deferral of Retirement Pensions, Shared Additional Pension and Graduated Retirement Benefit) (Miscellaneous Provisions) Regulations (Northern Ireland) 2006 (S.R. 2006 No. 104)
 Animals and Animal Products (Import and Export) (Amendment) Regulations (Northern Ireland) 2006 (S.R. 2006 No. 105)
 Optical Charges and Payments (Amendment) Regulations (Northern Ireland) 2006 (S.R. 2006 No. 106)
 Potatoes Originating in Egypt (Amendment) Regulations (Northern Ireland) 2006 (S.R. 2006 No. 107)
 Guaranteed Minimum Pensions Increase Order (Northern Ireland) 2006 (S.R. 2006 No. S.R. 2006 No. 108)
 Social Security Benefits Up-rating Order (Northern Ireland) 2006 (S.R. 2006 No. 109)
 Social Security Benefits Up-rating Regulations (Northern Ireland) 2006 (S.R. 2006 No. 110)
 Social Security (Industrial Injuries) (Dependency) (Permitted Earnings Limits) Order (Northern Ireland) 2006 (S.R. 2006 No. 111)
 Local Government Pension Scheme (Amendment No. 2) Regulations (Northern Ireland) 2006 (S.R. 2006 No. 112)
 Social Security (Deferral of Retirement Pensions etc.) Regulations (Northern Ireland) 2006 (S.R. 2006 No. S.R. 2006 No. 113)
 Game Preservation (Special Protection for Irish Hares) Order (Northern Ireland) 2006 (S.R. 2006 No. 114)
 Lord Chancellor (Consequential Provisions) Order (Northern Ireland) 2006 (S.R. 2006 No. 115)
 Fish Labelling (Amendment) Regulations (Northern Ireland) 2006 (S.R. 2006 No. 116)
 Legal Advice and Assistance (Financial Conditions) Regulations (Northern Ireland) 2006 (S.R. 2006 No. 117)
 Legal Advice and Assistance (Amendment) Regulations (Northern Ireland) 2006 (S.R. 2006 No. 118)
 Legal Aid (Financial Conditions) Regulations (Northern Ireland) 2006 (S.R. 2006 No. 119)
 Occupational Pension Schemes (Trustees' Knowledge and Understanding) Regulations (Northern Ireland) 2006 (S.R. 2006 No. 120)
 Police Service of Northern Ireland Pensions (Pension Sharing) Regulations 2006 (S.R. 2006 No. S.R. 2006 No. 122)
 Police Service of Northern Ireland Pensions (Amendment) Regulations 2006 (S.R. 2006 No. 123)
 Justice (Northern Ireland) Act 2002 (Commencement No. 11) Order 2006 (S.R. 2006 No. 124)
 Judicial Pensions (Northern Ireland) (Widows' and Children's Benefits) (Amendment) Regulations 2006 (S.R. 2006 No. 125)
 Judicial Pensions (Additional Voluntary Contributions) (Amendment) Regulations (Northern Ireland) 2006 (S.R. 2006 No. 126)
 Pensions Increase (Review) Order (Northern Ireland) 2006 (S.R. 2006 No. 127)
 Social Security (Young Persons) (Amendment) Regulations (Northern Ireland) 2006 (S.R. 2006 No. 128)
 Workmen's Compensation (Supplementation) (Amendment) Regulations (Northern Ireland) 2006 (S.R. 2006 No. 131)
 Occupational Pension Schemes (Levy Ceiling) Order (Northern Ireland) 2006 (S.R. 2006 No. 132)
 Social Security (Industrial Injuries) (Prescribed Diseases) (Amendment No. 2) Regulations (Northern Ireland) 2006 (S.R. 2006 No. 133)
 Working Time (Amendment) Regulations (Northern Ireland) 2006 (S.R. 2006 No. 135)
 Travelling Expenses and Remission of Charges (Amendment) Regulations (Northern Ireland) 2006 (S.R. 2006 No. 136)
 Companies (1986 Order) (Investment Companies and Accounting and Audit Amendments) Regulations (Northern Ireland) 2006 (S.R. 2006 No. 137)
 Companies (Summary Financial Statement) (Amendment) Regulations (Northern Ireland) 2006 (S.R. 2006 No. 138)
 Companies (Revision of Defective Accounts and Report) (Amendment) Regulations (Northern Ireland) 2006 139)
 Pension Protection Fund (Provision of Information) (Amendment) Regulations (Northern Ireland) 2006 (S.R. 2006 No. 140)
 Occupational and Personal Pension Schemes (Miscellaneous Amendments) Regulations (Northern Ireland) 2006 (S.R. 2006 No. 141)
 Statutory Sick Pay (General) (Amendment) Regulations (Northern Ireland) 2006 (S.R. 2006 No. 142)
 Charges for Drugs and Appliances (Amendment) Regulations (Northern Ireland) 2006 (S.R. 2006 No. 145)
 Rates (Capital Values, etc.) (2006 Order) (Commencement) Order (Northern Ireland) 2006 (S.R. 2006 No. 146)
 Occupational Pension Schemes (Member-nominated Trustees and Directors) Regulations (Northern Ireland) 2006 (S.R. 2006 No. 148)
 Occupational Pension Schemes (Modification of Schemes) Regulations (Northern Ireland) 2006 (S.R. 2006 No. 149)
 Social Security (Incapacity for Work) (Amendment) Regulations (Northern Ireland) 2006 (S.R. 2006 No. 150)
 Local Government (2005 Order) (Commencement No. 2 and Savings) Order (Northern Ireland) 2006 (S.R. 2006 No. 151)
 Police Service of Northern Ireland Pensions (Amendment No. 2) Regulations 2006 (S.R. 2006 No. 152)
 Weighing Equipment (Automatic Catchweighing Instruments) Regulations (Northern Ireland) 2006 (S.R. 2006 No. 154)
 Pension Protection Fund (General and Miscellaneous Amendments) Regulations (Northern Ireland) 2006 (S.R. 2006 No. 155)
 Pension Protection Fund (Reviewable Matters and Review and Reconsideration of Reviewable Matters) (Amendment) Regulations (Northern Ireland) 2006 (S.R. 2006 No. 156)
 Weighing Equipment (Beltweighers) Regulations (Northern Ireland) 2006 (S.R. 2006 No. 157)
 Social Security (Provisions relating to Qualifying Young Persons) (Amendment) Regulations (Northern Ireland) 2006 (S.R. 2006 No. S.R. 2006 No. 158)
 Health and Personal Social Services (Superannuation Scheme and Injury Benefits) (Amendment) Regulations (Northern Ireland) 2006 (S.R. 2006 No. 159)
 Occupational Pension Schemes (Cross-border Activities) (Amendment) Regulations (Northern Ireland) 2006 (S.R. 2006 No. 160)
 Occupational Pension Schemes (Payments to Employer) Regulations (Northern Ireland) 2006 (S.R. 2006 No. 161)
 Occupational Pension Schemes (Levies) (Amendment) Regulations (Northern Ireland) 2006 (S.R. 2006 No. 162)
 Teachers' Superannuation (Miscellaneous Amendments) Regulations (Northern Ireland) 2006 (S.R. 2006 No. 163)
 Zebra, Pelican and Puffin Pedestrian Crossings Regulations (Northern Ireland) 2006 (S.R. 2006 No. 164)
 Plant Health (Amendment) Order (Northern Ireland) 2006 (S.R. 2006 No. 165)
 Social Security (Incapacity Benefit Work-focused Interviews) (Amendment) Regulations (Northern Ireland) 2006 (S.R. 2006 No. 167)
 Social Security (Miscellaneous Amendments No. 2) Regulations (Northern Ireland) 2006 (S.R. 2006 No. 168)
 Social Fund (Application for Review) (Amendment) Regulations (Northern Ireland) 2006 (S.R. 2006 No. 169)
 Judicial Pensions (Spouses' and Children's Benefits) (Amendment) Regulations (Northern Ireland) 2006 (S.R. 2006 No. 170)
 Agriculture (2004 Order) (Commencement and Appointed Day) Order (Northern Ireland) 2006 (S.R. 2006 No. 172)
 Carriage of Dangerous Goods and Use of Transportable Pressure Equipment Regulations (Northern Ireland) 2006 (S.R. 2006 No. 173)
 Service Provision Change (Protection of Employment) Regulations (Northern Ireland) 2006 (S.R. 2006 No. 177)
 Social Security (Persons from Abroad) (Amendment) Regulations (Northern Ireland) 2006 (S.R. 2006 No. 178)
 Welfare Foods (Amendment) Regulations (Northern Ireland) 2006 (S.R. 2006 No. 180)
 Superannuation (Chief Electoral Officer for Northern Ireland) Order (Northern Ireland) 2006 (S.R. 2006 No. 181)
 Carriage of Explosives Regulations (Northern Ireland) 2006 (S.R. 2006 No. 182)
 Domestic Energy Efficiency Grants (Amendment No. 5) Regulations (Northern Ireland) 2006 (S.R. 2006 No. 183)
 Social Security (PPF Payments and FAS Payments) (Consequential Amendments) Regulations (Northern Ireland) 2006 (S.R. 2006 No. 184)
 Seed Potatoes (Crop Fees) Regulations (Northern Ireland) 2006 (S.R. 2006 No. 186)
 Seed Potatoes (Tuber Inspection Fees) Regulations (Northern Ireland) 2006 (S.R. 2006 No. 187)
 Superannuation (Agri-food and Biosciences Institute) Order (Northern Ireland) 2006 (S.R. 2006 No. 188)
 Gangmasters (Appeals) Regulations (Northern Ireland) 2006 (S.R. 2006 No. 189)
 Travelling Expenses and Remission of Charges (Amendment No. 2) Regulations (Northern Ireland) 2006 (S.R. 2006 No. 190)
 Departments (Transfer of Functions) Order (Northern Ireland) 2006 (S.R. 2006 No. 192)
 Legal Advice and Assistance (Amendment No. 2) Regulations (Northern Ireland) 2006 (S.R. 2006 No. 193)
 Common Agricultural Policy Single Payment and Support Schemes (Set-aside) (Amendment) Regulations (Northern Ireland) 2006 (S.R. 2006 No. 200)

201-300

 Transmissible Spongiform Encephalopathies Regulations (Northern Ireland) 2006 (S.R. 2006 No. 202)
 Social Security (Electronic Communications) (Miscellaneous Benefits) Order (Northern Ireland) 2006 (S.R. 2006 No. 203)
 Quarries (Explosives) Regulations (Northern Ireland) 2006 (S.R. 2006 No. 204)
 Quarries Regulations (Northern Ireland) 2006 (S.R. 2006 No. 205)
 Labour Relations Agency (Flexible Working) Arbitration Scheme Order (Northern Ireland) 2006 (S.R. 2006 No. 206)
 Pharmaceutical Society of Northern Ireland (General) (Amendment) Regulations (Northern Ireland) 2006 (S.R. 2006 No. 207)
 Countryside Management (Amendment) Regulations (Northern Ireland) 2006 (S.R. 2006 No. 208)
 Environmentally Sensitive Areas Designation (Amendment) Order (Northern Ireland) 2006 (S.R. 2006 No. 209)
 Firemen's Pension Scheme Order (Northern Ireland) 2006 (S.R. 2006 No. 210)
 Common Agricultural Policy Single Payment and Support Schemes (Amendment) Regulations (Northern Ireland) 2006 (S.R. 2006 No. 211)
 Employment of Children (Amendment) Regulations (Northern Ireland) 2006 (S.R. 2006 No. 212)
 Planning (Inquiry Procedure) Rules (Northern Ireland) 2006 (S.R. 2006 No. 213)
 Misuse of Drugs (Amendment) (No. 2) Regulations (Northern Ireland) 2006 (S.R. 2006 No. 214)
 Planning (National Security Directions and Appointed Representatives) Rules (Northern Ireland) 2006 (S.R. 2006 No. 215)
 Ceramic Articles in Contact with Food Regulations (Northern Ireland) 2006 (S.R. 2006 No. 217)
 Planning (Application of Subordinate Legislation to the Crown) Order (Northern Ireland) 2006 (S.R. 2006 No. 218)
 Planning (General Development) (Amendment) Order (Northern Ireland) 2006 (S.R. 2006 No. 219)
 Pesticides (Maximum Residue Levels in Crops, Food and Feeding Stuffs) Regulations (Northern Ireland) 2006 (S.R. 2006 No. 220)
 Planning Reform (2006 Order) (Commencement No. 1) Order (Northern Ireland) 2006 (S.R. 2006 No. 222)
 Occupational Pension Schemes (Contracting-out) (Amendment) Regulations (Northern Ireland) 2006 (S.R. 2006 No. 223)
 Public Angling Estate (Amendment) Byelaws (Northern Ireland) 2006 (S.R. 2006 No. 224)
 Planning Appeals Commission (Decisions on Appeals and Making of Reports) Rules (Northern Ireland) 2006 (S.R. 2006 No. 225)
 Whole of Government Accounts (Designation of Bodies) (Northern Ireland) Order 2006  S.R. 2006 No. 226)
 Pensions (2005 Order) (Codes of Practice) (Early Leavers, Late Payment of Contributions and Trustee Knowledge and Understanding) (Appointed Day) Order (Northern Ireland) 2006 (S.R. 2006 No. 231)
 Agriculture (Weather Aid 2002) (Amendment) Scheme (Northern Ireland) 2006 (S.R. 2006 No. 232)
 Planning Appeals Commission (Decisions on Appeals and Making of Reports) (No. 2) Rules (Northern Ireland) 2006 (S.R. 2006 No. 233)
 Social Security (Income Support and Jobseeker's Allowance) (Amendment) Regulations (Northern Ireland) 2006 (S.R. 2006 No. 234)
 Gangmasters (Appeals) (Amendment) Regulations (Northern Ireland) 2006 (S.R. 2006 No. 235)
 Railways (Safety Management) Regulations (Northern Ireland) 2006 (S.R. 2006 No. 237)
 Planning (Claims for Compensation) Regulations (Northern Ireland) 2006 (S.R. 2006 No. 238)
 Pharmaceutical Society of Northern Ireland (General) (Amendment No. 2) Regulations (Northern Ireland) 2006 (S.R. 2006 No. 240)
 Sales, Markets and Lairs (Amendment) Order (Northern Ireland) 2006 (S.R. 2006 No. 241)
 Industrial and Provident Societies (2006 Order) (Commencement) Order (Northern Ireland) 2006 (S.R. 2006 No. 242)
 Unauthorised Encampments (Retention and Disposal of Vehicles) Regulations (Northern Ireland) 2006 (S.R. 2006 No. 243)
 Unauthorised Encampments (2005 Order) (Commencement) Order (Northern Ireland) 2006 (S.R. 2006 No. 244)
 Legal Aid in Criminal Proceedings (Costs) (Amendment) Rules (Northern Ireland) 2006 (S.R. 2006 No. 245)
 Motor Vehicles (Construction and Use) (Amendment No. 2) Regulations (Northern Ireland) 2006 (S.R. 2006 No. 246)
 Public Service Vehicles (Amendment) Regulations (Northern Ireland) 2006 (S.R. 2006 No. 247)
 Public Service Vehicles (Conditions of Fitness, Equipment and Use) (Amendment No. 2) Regulations (Northern Ireland) 2006 (S.R. 2006 No. 248)
 Public Service Vehicles Accessibility (Amendment) Regulations (Northern Ireland) 2006 (S.R. 2006 No. 249)
 Fire Services (Discipline) (Revocation) Regulations (Northern Ireland) 2006 (S.R. 2006 No. 250)
 Plastic Materials and Articles in Contact with Food Regulations (Northern Ireland) 2006 (S.R. 2006 No. 251)
 Education (Student Support) (2005 Regulations) (Amendment) Regulations (Northern Ireland) 2006 (S.R. 2006 No. 252)
 Pig Carcase (Grading) (Amendment) Regulations (Northern Ireland) 2006 (S.R. 2006 No. 253)
 Management of Health and Safety at Work (Amendment) Regulations (Northern Ireland) 2006 (S.R. 2006 No. 255)
 Contaminants in Food Regulations (Northern Ireland) 2006 (S.R. 2006 No. 256)
 Fire and Rescue Services (2006 Order) (Commencement No. 1) Order (Northern Ireland) 2006 (S.R. 2006 No. 257)
 Community Benefit Societies (Restriction on Use of Assets) Regulations (Northern Ireland) 2006 (S.R. 2006 No. 258)
 Planning (Inquiry Procedure) (Amendment) Rules (Northern Ireland) 2006 (S.R. 2006 No. 259)
 Lands Tribunal (Superannuation) (Amendment) Order (Northern Ireland) 2006 (S.R. 2006 No. 260)
 Employment Equality (Age) Regulations (Northern Ireland) 2006 (S.R. 2006 No. 261)
 Industrial Tribunals (Interest on Awards in Age Discrimination Cases) Regulations (Northern Ireland) 2006 (S.R. 2006 No. 262)
 Animals and Animal Products (Examination for Residues and Maximum Residue Limits) (Amendment) Regulations (Northern Ireland) 2006 (S.R. 2006 No. 263)
 Misuse of Drugs (Amendment) (No. 3) Regulations (Northern Ireland) 2006 (S.R. 2006 No. 264)
 Lands Tribunal (Salaries) Order (Northern Ireland) 2006 (S.R. 2006 No. 265)
 Planning (Issue of Certificate) Rules (Northern Ireland) 2006 (S.R. 2006 No. 266)
 Police Service of Northern Ireland and Police Service of Northern Ireland Reserve (Injury Benefit) Regulations 2006 (S.R. 2006 No. 268)
 Child Support (Miscellaneous Amendments) Regulations (Northern Ireland) 2006 (S.R. 2006 No. 273)
 Passenger and Goods Vehicles (Recording Equipment) (Amendment) Regulations (Northern Ireland) 2006 (S.R. 2006 No. 274)
 Planning (Electronic Communications) Order (Northern Ireland) 2006 (S.R. 2006 No. 276)
 Industrial Training Levy (Construction Industry) Order (Northern Ireland) 2006 (S.R. 2006 No. 277)
 Plant Protection Products (Amendment) Regulations (Northern Ireland) 2006 (S.R. 2006 No. 278)
 Waste Management Regulations (Northern Ireland) 2006 (S.R. 2006 No. 280)
 Drainage Trusts (Dissolution) Order (Northern Ireland) 2006 (S.R. 2006 No. 281)
 Pension Protection Fund (Pension Sharing) Regulations (Northern Ireland) 2006 (S.R. 2006 No. 282)
 Motor Hackney Carriages (Belfast) (Amendment) By-Laws (Northern Ireland) 2006 (S.R. 2006 No. 284)
 Planning (National Security Directions and Appointed Representatives) (Amendment) Rules (Northern Ireland) 2006 (S.R. 2006 No. 285)
 Contracting Out (Functions Relating to Child Support) Order (Northern Ireland) 2006 (S.R. 2006 No. 286)
 Eggs (Marketing Standards) (Amendment) Regulations (Northern Ireland) 2006 (S.R. 2006 No. 287)
 Disability Discrimination (2006 Order) (Commencement No. 1) Order (Northern Ireland) 2006 (S.R. 2006 No. 289)
 Planning (Conservation Areas) (Consultation) Regulations (Northern Ireland) 2006 (S.R. 2006 No. 290)
 Products of Animal Origin (Third Country Imports) Regulations (Northern Ireland) 2006 (S.R. 2006 No. 291)
 Belfast Health and Social Services Trust (Establishment) Order (Northern Ireland) 2006 (S.R. 2006 No. 292)
 South Eastern Health and Social Services Trust (Establishment) Order (Northern Ireland) 2006 (S.R. 2006 No. 293)
 Southern Health and Social Services Trust (Establishment) Order (Northern Ireland) 2006 (S.R. 2006 No. 294)
 Northern Health and Social Services Trust (Establishment) Order (Northern Ireland) 2006 (S.R. 2006 No. 295)
 Western Health and Social Services Trust (Establishment) Order (Northern Ireland) 2006 (S.R. 2006 No. 296)
 Occupational Pension Schemes (Winding up Procedure Requirement) Regulations (Northern Ireland) 2006 (S.R. 2006 No. 297)
 Employer's Liability (Compulsory Insurance) (Amendment) Regulations (Northern Ireland) 2006 (S.R. 2006 No. 298)
 Sea Fishing (Restriction on Days at Sea) (Monitoring, Inspection and Surveillance) Order (Northern Ireland) 2006 300)

301-400

 Social Security (Students and Income-related Benefits) (Amendment) Regulations (Northern Ireland) 2006 (S.R. 2006 No. 301)
 Salaries (Comptroller and Auditor General) Order (Northern Ireland) 2006 (S.R. 2006 No. 302)
 Farm Subsidies (Review of Decisions) (Amendment) Regulations (Northern Ireland) 2006 (S.R. 2006 No. 303)
 Family Proceedings (Amendment) Rules (Northern Ireland) 2006 (S.R. 2006 No. 304)
 Rules of the Supreme Court (Northern Ireland) (Amendment No. 2) 2006 (S.R. 2006 No. 305)
 Education (Student Loans) (Amendment) Regulations (Northern Ireland) 2006 (S.R. 2006 No. 307)
 Divorce etc. (Pension Protection Fund) Regulations (Northern Ireland) 2006 (S.R. 2006 No. 310)
 Dissolution etc. (Pension Protection Fund) Regulations (Northern Ireland) 2006 (S.R. 2006 No. 311)
 Education (Student Support) Regulations (Northern Ireland) 2006 (S.R. 2006 No. 312)
 Police Service of Northern Ireland Reserve (Full-time) Severance Regulations 2006 (S.R. 2006 No. 313)
 Health and Personal Social Services (Primary Medical Services) (Miscellaneous Amendments) Regulations (Northern Ireland) 2006 (S.R. 2006 No. 319)
 Social Security (Lebanon) (Amendment) Regulations (Northern Ireland) 2006 (S.R. 2006 No. 320)
 Ozone Depleting Substances (Qualifications) Regulations (Northern Ireland) 2006 (S.R. 2006 No. 321)
 Motor Vehicles (Construction and Use) (Amendment No. 3) Regulations (Northern Ireland) 2006 (S.R. 2006 No. 328)
 Education (Student Loans) (Amendment) (No. 2) Regulations (Northern Ireland) 2006 (S.R. 2006 No. 329)
 Seed Potatoes (Tuber Inspection Fees) (Amendment) Regulations (Northern Ireland) 2006 (S.R. 2006 No. 330)
 Education (Student Loans) (Repayment) (Amendment) (No. 2) Regulations (Northern Ireland) 2006 (S.R. 2006 No. 331)
 Special Educational Needs and Disability (Northern Ireland) Order 2005 (Amendment) (Further and Higher Education) Regulations (Northern Ireland) 2006 (S.R. 2006 No. 332)
 Travelling Expenses and Remission of Charges (Amendment No. 3) Regulations (Northern Ireland) 2006 2006 (S.R. 2006 No. 333)
 Misuse of Drugs (Amendment) (No. 4) Regulations (Northern Ireland) 2006 (S.R. 2006 No. 334)
 Agriculture (Safety of Children and Young Persons) Regulations (Northern Ireland) 2006 (S.R. 2006 No. 335)
 Adoption of Children from Overseas and Intercountry Adoption (Hague Convention) (Amendment) Regulations (Northern Ireland) 2006 (S.R. 2006 No. 336)
 Removal, Storage and Disposal of Vehicles (Prescribed Charges) Regulations (Northern Ireland) 2006 (S.R. 2006 No. 337)
 Penalty Charges (Prescribed Amounts) Regulations (Northern Ireland) 2006 (S.R. 2006 No. 338)
 Immobilisation and Release of Vehicles (Charge) Regulations (Northern Ireland) 2006 (S.R. 2006 No. 339)
 Gangmasters Licensing (Exclusions) Regulations (Northern Ireland) 2006 (S.R. 2006 No. 340)
 Regulation and Improvement Authority (Fees and Frequency of Inspections) (Amendment) Regulations (Northern Ireland) 2006 (S.R. 2006 No. 341)
 Care Tribunal (Amendment) Regulations (Northern Ireland) 2006 (S.R. 2006 No. 342)
 Motor Vehicles (Approval) (Amendment) Regulations (Northern Ireland) 2006 (S.R. 2006 No. 343)
 Work and Families (Northern Ireland) Order 2006 (Commencement No. 1) Order (Northern Ireland) 2006 (S.R. 2006 No. 344)
 Radioactive Contaminated Land Regulations (Northern Ireland) 2006 (S.R. 2006 No. 345)
 Animals and Animal Products (Import and Export) (Amendment No.2) Regulations (Northern Ireland) 2006 (S.R. 2006 No. 346)
 Traffic Management (2005 Order) (Commencement) Order (Northern Ireland) 2006 (S.R. 2006 No. 347)
 Planning (General Development) (Amendment No. 2) Order (Northern Ireland) 2006 (S.R. 2006 No. 348)
 Food (Emergency Control) (Revocation) Regulations (Northern Ireland) 2006 (S.R. 2006 No. 351)
 Pensions (2005 Order) (Commencement No. 10 and Savings) Order (Northern Ireland) 2006 (S.R. 2006 No. 352)
 Insurance Accounts Directive (Miscellaneous Insurance Undertakings) (Amendment) Regulations (Northern Ireland) 2006 (S.R. 2006 No. 353)
 Partnerships and Unlimited Companies (Accounts) (Amendment) Regulations (Northern Ireland) 2006 (S.R. 2006 No. 354)
 Building (Amendment) Regulations (Northern Ireland) 2006 (S.R. 2006 No. 355)
 Producer Responsibility Obligations (Packaging Waste) Regulations (Northern Ireland) 2006 (S.R. 2006 No. 356)
 Employment Protection (Continuity of Employment) (Amendment) Regulations (Northern Ireland) 2006 (S.R. 2006 No. 357)
 Gas Order 1996 (Amendment) Regulations (Northern Ireland) 2006 (S.R. 2006 No. 358)
 Social Security (Miscellaneous Amendments No. 4) Regulations (Northern Ireland) 2006 (S.R. 2006 No. 359)
 Social Security (1998 Order) (Commencement No. 13) Order (Northern Ireland) 2006 (S.R. 2006 No. 360)
 Statutory Maternity Pay, Social Security (Maternity Allowance) and Social Security (Overlapping Benefits) (Amendment) Regulations (Northern Ireland) 2006 (S.R. 2006 No. 361)
 On-Street Parking (Amendment) Order (Northern Ireland) 2006 (S.R. 2006 No. 362)
 Off-Street Parking (Amendment No. 2) Order (Northern Ireland) 2006 (S.R. 2006 No. 363)
 Social Security (Miscellaneous Amendments No. 3) Regulations (Northern Ireland) 2006 (S.R. 2006 No. 365)
 Teachers' Superannuation (Miscellaneous Amendments) (No. 2) Regulations (Northern Ireland) 2006 (S.R. 2006 No. 366)
 Criminal Justice (2005 Order) (Commencement No. 2) Order (Northern Ireland) 2006 (S.R. 2006 No. 368)
 Collective Redundancies (Amendment) Regulations (Northern Ireland) 2006 (S.R. 2006 No. 369)
 Insolvency (Northern Ireland) Order 1989 (Amendment) Regulations (Northern Ireland) 2006 (S.R. 2006 No. 370)
 Consumer Protection (Code of Practice for Traders on Price Indications) Approval Order (Northern Ireland) 2006 (S.R. 2006 No. 371)
 Maternity and Parental Leave etc. (Amendment) Regulations (Northern Ireland) 2006 (S.R. 2006 No. 372)
 Paternity and Adoption Leave (Amendment) Regulations (Northern Ireland) 2006 (S.R. 2006 No. 373)
 Statutory Paternity Pay and Statutory Adoption Pay (Amendment) Regulations (Northern Ireland) 2006 (S.R. 2006 No. 374)
 Penalty Charges (Exemption from Criminal Proceedings) Regulations (Northern Ireland) 2006 (S.R. 2006 No. 376)
 Limited Liability Partnerships (Amendment) Regulations (Northern Ireland) 2006 (S.R. 2006 No. 377)
 Students Awards (Amendment) Regulations (Northern Ireland) 2006 (S.R. 2006 No. 378)
 Social Security (Persons from Abroad) (Amendment No. 2) Regulations (Northern Ireland) 2006 (S.R. 2006 No. 379)
 Planning Reform (2006 Order) (Commencement No.2) Order (Northern Ireland) 2006 (S.R. 2006 No. 380)
 Planning (Development Plans) (Amendment) Regulations (Northern Ireland) 2006 (S.R. 2006 No. 382)
 Education (Student Support) (Amendment) Regulations (Northern Ireland) 2006 (S.R. 2006 No. 383)
 Student Fees (Qualifying Courses and Persons) Regulations (Northern Ireland) 2006 (S.R. 2006 No. 384)
 Environmental Noise Regulations (Northern Ireland) 2006 (S.R. 2006 No. 387)
 Social Security (1998 Order) (Prescribed Benefits) Regulations (Northern Ireland) 2006 (S.R. 2006 No. 388)
 Working Time (Amendment No.2) Regulations (Northern Ireland) 2006 (S.R. 2006 No. 389)
 Superannuation (Chief Electoral Officer for Northern Ireland) (Amendment) Order (Northern Ireland) 2006 (S.R. 2006 No. 393)
 Northern Ireland Social Care Council (Social Care Workers) Regulations (Northern Ireland) 2006 (S.R. 2006 No. 394)
 Employment Equality (Age) (Amendment) Regulations (Northern Ireland) 2006 (S.R. 2006 No. 395)
 Northern Ireland Social Care Council (Description of Social Care Workers) Order (Northern Ireland) 2006 (S.R. 2006 No. 396)
 Allocation of Housing and Homelessness (Eligibility) Regulations (Northern Ireland) 2006 (S.R. 2006 No. 397)
 Social Security (Incapacity Benefit Work-focused Interviews) (Amendment No. 2) Regulations (Northern Ireland) 2006 (S.R. 2006 No. 398)
 Traffic Signs (Amendment) Regulations (Northern Ireland) 2006 (S.R. 2006 No. 399)
 Local Government Pension Scheme (Management and Investment of Funds) (Amendment) Regulations (Northern Ireland) 2006 (S.R. 2006 No. 400)

401-500

 Animals and Animal Products (Import and Export) Regulations (Northern Ireland) 2006 (S.R. 2006 No. 401)
 Social Security (1998 Order) (Commencement Nos. 8 and 10) (Amendment) Order (Northern Ireland) 2006 (S.R. 2006 No. 402)
 Education (Supply of Student Support Information to Governing Bodies) Regulations (Northern Ireland) 2006 (S.R. 2006 No. 403)
 Gas (Designation of Pipelines) Order (Northern Ireland) 2006 (S.R. 2006 No. 404)
 Housing Benefit Regulations (Northern Ireland) 2006 (S.R. 2006 No. 405)
 Housing Benefit (Persons who have attained the qualifying age for state pension credit) Regulations (Northern Ireland) 2006 (S.R. 2006 No. 406)
 Housing Benefit (Consequential Provisions) Regulations (Northern Ireland) 2006 (S.R. 2006 No. 407)
 Motor Vehicles (Taxi Drivers' Licences) (Fees) (Amendment) Regulations (Northern Ireland) 2006 (S.R. 2006 No. 408)
 Pension Protection Fund (Levy Ceiling) Regulations (Northern Ireland) 2006 (S.R. 2006 No. 409)
 Health and Personal Social Services (Superannuation Scheme, Injury Benefits and Additional Voluntary Contributions) (Amendment) Regulations (Northern Ireland) 2006 (S.R. 2006 No. 410)
 Street Works (Reinstatement) (Amendment) Regulations (Northern Ireland) 2006 (S.R. 2006 No. 412)
 Magistrates' Courts (Amendment) Rules (Northern Ireland) 2006 (S.R. 2006 No. 413)
 Magistrates' Courts (Anti-social Behaviour Orders) (Amendment) Rules (Northern Ireland) 2006 (S.R. 2006 No. 414)
 Curd Cheese (Restriction on Placing on the Market) Regulations (Northern Ireland) 2006 (S.R. 2006 No. 415)
 Dangerous Wild Animals (2004 Order) (Commencement No. 1) Order (Northern Ireland) 2006 (S.R. 2006 No. 416)
 Dangerous Wild Animals (Fees) Order (Northern Ireland) 2006 (S.R. 2006 No. 417)
 Food Benefit Schemes (2003 Order) (Commencement) Order (Northern Ireland) 2006 (S.R. 2006 No. 418)
 Plastic Materials and Articles in Contact with Food (No 2) Regulations (Northern Ireland) 2006 (S.R. 2006 No. 420)
 Traffic Management (Proceedings before Adjudicators) Regulations (Northern Ireland) 2006 (S.R. 2006 No. 421)
 Further Education (Student Support) (Cross-Border Eligibility) Regulations (Northern Ireland) 2006 (S.R. 2006 No. 422)
 Employment Protection (Code of Practice) (Disclosure of Information) (Appointed Day) Order (Northern Ireland) 2006 (S.R. 2006 No. 423)
 Energy (Amendment) Order (Northern Ireland) 2006 (S.R. 2006 No. 424)
 Manufacture and Storage of Explosives Regulations (Northern Ireland) 2006 (S.R. 2006 No. 425)
 Feeding Stuffs (Amendment) Regulations (Northern Ireland) 2006 (S.R. 2006 No. 427)
 Private Tenancies (2006 Order) (Commencement) Order (Northern Ireland) 2006 (S.R. 2006 No. 428)
 Agricultural Wages (Abolition of Permits to Infirm and Incapacitated Persons) Regulations (Northern Ireland) 2006 (S.R. 2006 No. 429)
 Penalty Charges (Exemption from Criminal Proceedings) (Amendment) Regulations (Northern Ireland) 2006 (S.R. 2006 No. 432)
 Contracting Out (Functions Relating to Child Support) (Amendment) Order (Northern Ireland) 2006 (S.R. 2006 No. 433)
 Plant Health (Amendment No. 2) Order (Northern Ireland) 2006 (S.R. 2006 No. 435)
 Social Security (National Insurance Numbers) (Amendment) Regulations (Northern Ireland) 2006 (S.R. 2006 No. 436)
 Food Benefit Schemes (2003 Order) (Commencement) (Amendment) Order (Northern Ireland) 2006 (S.R. 2006 No. 437)
 Companies (1986 Order) (Small Companies' Accounts and Audit) Regulations (Northern Ireland) 2006 (S.R. 2006 No. 438)
 Equality Act (Sexual Orientation) Regulations (Northern Ireland) 2006 S.R. 2006 No. 439)
 Building (Amendment No. 2) Regulations (Northern Ireland) 2006 (S.R. 2006 No. 440)
 Teachers' (Eligibility) (Amendment) Regulations (Northern Ireland) 2006 (S.R. 2006 No. 441)
 Salaries (Assembly Ombudsman and Commissioner for Complaints) Order (Northern Ireland) 2006 (S.R. 2006 No. 442)
 Rice Products (Restriction on First Placing on the Market) Regulations (Northern Ireland) 2006 (S.R. 2006 No. 443)
 Pensions (2005 Order) (Disclosure of Restricted Information) (Amendment of Specified Persons) Order (Northern Ireland) 2006 (S.R. 2006 No. 444)
 Housing Benefit (Consequential Provisions) (Amendment) Regulations (Northern Ireland) 2006 (S.R. 2006 No. 449)
 Motor Hackney Carriages (Belfast) (Amendment No. 2) By-Laws (Northern Ireland) 2006 (S.R. 2006 No. 450)
 Criminal Justice (2003 Order) (Commencement No. 3) Order (Northern Ireland) 2006 (S.R. 2006 No. 451)
 Housing Renewal Grants (Reduction of Grant) (Amendment) Regulations (Northern Ireland) 2006 (S.R. 2006 No. 452)
 Employment Equality (Age) (Amendment No. 2) Regulations (Northern Ireland) 2006 (S.R. 2006 No. 453)
 Meat (Official Controls Charges) Regulations (Northern Ireland) 2006 (S.R. 2006 No. 454)
 Student Fees (Amounts) (Amendment) Regulations (Northern Ireland) 2006 (S.R. 2006 No. 455)
 Public Interest Disclosure (Prescribed Persons) (Amendment) Order (Northern Ireland) 2006 (S.R. 2006 No. 458)
 Common Agricultural Policy Single Payment and Support Schemes (Cross Compliance) (Amendment) Regulations (Northern Ireland) 2006 (S.R. 2006 No. 459)
 Pensions (2005 Order) (Codes of Practice) (Member-nominated Trustees and Directors and Internal Controls) (Appointed Day) Order (Northern Ireland) 2006 (S.R. 2006 No. 460)
 Insolvency Regulations (Northern Ireland) 1996 (Electronic Communications) Order (Northern Ireland) 2006 (S.R. 2006 No. 461)
 Housing Benefit (Amendment) Regulations (Northern Ireland) 2006 (S.R. 2006 No. 462)
 Housing Benefit (Electronic Communications) Order (Northern Ireland) 2006 (S.R. 2006 No. 463)
 Rates (Amendment) (2006 Order) (Commencement No. 1) Order (Northern Ireland) 2006 (S.R. 2006 No. 464)
 Equality Act (Sexual Orientation) (Amendment) Regulations (Northern Ireland) 2006 (S.R. 2006 No. 466)
 Occupational Pensions (Revaluation) Order (Northern Ireland) 2006 (S.R. 2006 No. 467)
 Rates (Transitional Provisions) Order (Northern Ireland) 2006 (S.R. 2006 No. 468)
 Justice (Northern Ireland) Act 2002 (Addition of Listed Judicial Offices etc.) Order 2006 (S.R. 2006 No. 469)
 Disability Discrimination (2006 Order) (Commencement No. 2) Order (Northern Ireland) 2006 (S.R. 2006 No. 470)
 Feed (Specified Undesirable Substances) Regulations (Northern Ireland) 2006 (S.R. 2006 No. 471)
 Welfare Foods (Amendment No. 2) Regulations (Northern Ireland) 2006 (S.R. 2006 No. 477)
 Healthy Start Scheme and Day Care Food Scheme Regulations (Northern Ireland) 2006 (S.R. 2006 No. 478)
 Immobilisation and Removal of Vehicles (Prescribed Conditions) Regulations (Northern Ireland) 2006 (S.R. 2006 No. 479)
 Children (Prescribed Orders – Isle of Man and Guernsey) Regulations (Northern Ireland) 2006 (S.R. 2006 No. 480)
 Food for Particular Nutritional Uses (Addition of Substances for Specific Nutritional Purposes) (Amendment) Regulations (Northern Ireland) 2006 (S.R. 2006 No. 481)
 Water Abstraction and Impoundment (Licensing) Regulations (Northern Ireland) 2006 (S.R. 2006 No. 482)
 Water Resources (Environmental Impact Assessment) (Amendment) Regulations (Northern Ireland) 2006 (S.R. 2006 No. 483)
 Recovery of Health Services Charges (2006 Order) (Commencement) Order (Northern Ireland) 2006 (S.R. 2006 No. 484)
 Fishery Products (Official Controls Charges) Regulations (Northern Ireland) 2006 (S.R. 2006 No. 485)
 Rules of the Supreme Court (Northern Ireland) (Amendment No. 3) 2006 (S.R. 2006 No. 486)
 Criminal Appeal (Trial without jury where danger of jury tampering and Trial by jury of sample counts only) Rules (Northern Ireland) 2006 (S.R. 2006 No. 487)
 Phosphorus (Use in Agriculture) Regulations (Northern Ireland) 2006 (S.R. 2006 No. 488)
 Nitrates Action Programme Regulations (Northern Ireland) 2006 (S.R. 2006 No. 489)
 Salmonella in Turkey Flocks and Herds of Slaughter Pigs (Survey Powers) Regulations (Northern Ireland) 2006 (S.R. 2006 No. 492)
 Curd Cheese (Restriction on Placing on the Market) (Amendment) Regulations (Northern Ireland) 2006 (S.R. 2006 No. 493)
 Motor Vehicle Testing (Amendment) Regulations (Northern Ireland) 2006 (S.R. 2006 No. 494)
 Goods Vehicles (Testing) (Amendment) Regulations (Northern Ireland) 2006 (S.R. 2006 No. 495)
 Dangerous Wild Animals (2004 Order) (Commencement No. 2) Order (Northern Ireland) 2006 (S.R. 2006 No. 496)
 Dangerous Wild Animals (Fees) (No. 2) Order (Northern Ireland) 2006 (S.R. 2006 No. 497)
 Rates (Making and Levying of Different Rates) Regulations (Northern Ireland) 2006 (S.R. 2006 No. 498)
 Crown Court (Amendment) Rules (Northern Ireland) 2006 (S.R. 2006 No. 499)
 Local Government Companies (Best Value) Order (Northern Ireland) 2006 (S.R. 2006 No. 500)

501-600

 Pesticides (Maximum Residue Levels in Crops, Food and Feeding Stuffs) (Amendment) Regulations (Northern Ireland) 2006 (S.R. 2006 No. 501)
 EC Fertilisers Regulations (Northern Ireland) 2006 (S.R. 2006 No. 503)
 Fair Employment (Specification of Public Authorities) (Amendment) Order (Northern Ireland) 2006 (S.R. 2006 No. 504)
 Recovery of Health Services Charges (Amounts) Regulations (Northern Ireland) 2006 (S.R. 2006 No. 507)
 Sheep and Goats (Records, Identification and Movement) (Amendment) Order (Northern Ireland) 2006 (S.R. 2006 No. 508)
 Waste Electrical and Electronic Equipment (Charges) Regulations (Northern Ireland) 2006 509)
 Social Security (Miscellaneous Amendments No. 5) Regulations (Northern Ireland) 2006 (S.R. 2006 No. 510)
 Grammar Schools (Charges) (Amendment) Regulations (Northern Ireland) 2006 (S.R. 2006 No. 511)
 Potatoes Originating in Egypt (Amendment No.2) Regulations (Northern Ireland) 2006 (S.R. 2006 No. 512)
 Eel Fishing (Licence Duties) Regulations (Northern Ireland) 2006 (S.R. 2006 No. 513)
 Insolvent Partnerships (Amendment) Order (Northern Ireland) 2006 (S.R. 2006 No. 515)
 Rates (Automatic Telling Machines) (Designation of Rural Areas) Order (Northern Ireland) 2006 (S.R. 2006 No. 516)
 Fisheries (Amendment) Byelaws (Northern Ireland) 2006 (S.R. 2006 No. 517)
 Environmental Impact Assessment (Forestry) Regulations (Northern Ireland) 2006 (S.R. 2006 No. 518)
 Waste Electrical and Electronic Equipment (Waste Management Licensing) Regulations (Northern Ireland) 2006 (S.R. 2006 No. 519)
 Carriage of Explosives (Amendment) Regulations (Northern Ireland) 2006 (S.R. 2006 No. 520)
 County Court (Amendment) Rules (Northern Ireland) 2006 (S.R. 2006 No. 521)
 Local Government (Accounts and Audit) (Amendment) Regulations (Northern Ireland) 2006 (S.R. 2006 No. 522)
 Social Security (Bulgaria and Romania) (Amendment) Regulations (Northern Ireland) 2006 (S.R. 2006 No. 523)
 Genetically Modified Organisms (Contained Use) (Amendment) Regulations (Northern Ireland) 2006 (S.R. 2006 No. 524)
 Carriage of Dangerous Goods and Use of Transportable Pressure Equipment (Amendment) Regulations (Northern Ireland) 2006 (S.R. 2006 No. 525)
 River Lagan Tidal Navigation and General Bye-laws (Northern Ireland) 2006 (S.R. 2006 No. 526)
 Laganside Corporation Dissolution Order (Northern Ireland) 2006 (S.R. 2006 No. 527)
 Pension Protection Fund (Insolvent Partnerships) (Amendment of Insolvency Events) Order (Northern Ireland) 2006 (S.R. 2006 No. 529)
 Recovery of Health Services Charges (General) Regulations (Northern Ireland) 2006 (S.R. 2006 No. 536)
 Farm Nutrient Management Scheme (Northern Ireland) 2006 (S.R. 2006 No. 537)
 Welfare of Animals (Transport) Regulations (Northern Ireland) 2006 (S.R. 2006 No. 538)

External links
  Statutory Rules (NI) List
 Draft Statutory Rules (NI) List

2006
Statutory rules
Northern Ireland Statutory Rules